Lady Newnes Bay is a bay about 60 mi long in the western Ross Sea, extending along the coast of Victoria Land from Cape Sibbald to Coulman Island. Discovered by the British Antarctic Expedition, 1898–1900, led by Carstens Borchgrevink. He named it for Lady Priscilla Newnes, whose husband, Sir George Newnes, financed the expedition.

Falkner Glacier forms a glacier tongue in the bay.

References

Bays of Victoria Land
Borchgrevink Coast